Common names: West-Asian blunt-nosed viper, Levant blunt-nosed viper.

Macrovipera lebetinus obtusa is a venomous viper subspecies endemic to Asia, from central Turkey to northern Pakistan (Kashmir).

Description
It can be distinguished from other subspecies of M. lebetina by its higher scale counts — usually 170-175 ventrals, and 25 (sometimes 27) rows of dorsal scales at midbody — and relatively dark color pattern.

Geographic range
It is found from central Turkey through Syria, Lebanon, Iraq, northern Jordan, the Caucasus region (incl. Armenia, Azerbaijan, Dagestan and rarely Georgia), Iran, southern Afghanistan, Pakistan and Himalayan regions of India. In Pakistan, according to Khan (1983), M. lebetina is restricted to the western highlands; it is allopatric with Daboia russelii, which occurs in the Indus River valley.

References

Further reading

Dwigubsky IA. Opyt Estestvennoi Istorii Vsech Zhivotnych Rossiskoi Imperii [Essay on the Natural History of the Animals of the Russian Empire]. Moscow: [Moscow Imperial University]. (in Russian).
 Engelmann W-E, Fritzsche J, Günther R, Obst FJ. 1993. Lurche und Kriechtiere Europas. Radebeul, Germany: Neumann Verlag. 440 pp. (including 324 color plates, 186 figures, 205 maps).
 Golay P, Smith HM, Broadley DG, Dixon JR, McCarthy CJ, Rage J-C, Schätti B, Toriba M. 1993. Endoglyphs and Other Major Venomous Snakes of the World: A Checklist. Geneva: Azemiops Herpetological Data Center. 478 pp.
 Khan MS. 1983. Venomous terrestrial snakes of Pakistan. The Snake 15 (2): 101-105.
 Obst FJ. Zur Kenntnis der Schlangengattung Vipera. Zool. Abh. staatl. Mus. Tierkunde Dresden 38: 229-235.

External links

 

Viperinae
Reptiles of Western Asia
Reptiles of Azerbaijan
Reptiles of Pakistan
Reptiles of the Middle East
Reptiles of South Asia